Ramesh Chandra Mishra is an Indian politician and a member of 17th Legislative Assembly of Uttar Pradesh of India. He represents the Badlapur constituency in Jaunpur district of Uttar Pradesh.

Early life and education
Mishra was born 10 July 1980 in Jaunpur, Uttar Pradesh to his father Shri Durga Prasad Mishra. In 1999 he married Sanju Mishra, they have two sons. He earned High School degree in 1995 from UP Board Allahabad.

Political career
Ramesh Chandra Mishra contested Uttar Pradesh Assembly Election as Bhartiya Janata Party candidate and defeated his close contestant Lalji Yadav from Bahujan Samaj Party by a margin of 2,372 votes.

Posts held

See also
Uttar Pradesh Legislative Assembly

References

Uttar Pradesh MLAs 2017–2022
People from Jaunpur district
1980 births
Living people
Uttar Pradesh MLAs 2022–2027
Bharatiya Janata Party politicians from Uttar Pradesh